Narewka  is a village in eastern Poland, with its population estimated at 935 residents (as of 2011). It is located in Gmina Narewka, Hajnówka County, within Podlaskie Voivodeship. The village is located near Poland's border with Belarus. Many of its residents belong to Poland's Belarusian minority. 

The village has Polish Catholic and Belarusian Eastern Orthodox churches. It used to have a synagogue, but it was destroyed by the local Jewish population, angered after the Red Army, which had invaded Poland in 1939, desecrated the synagogue by turning it into a storage building. Narewka's significant Jewish community eventually perished in the Holocaust and has not been restored.

It is in one of five Polish-Belarusian bilingual regions in Podlaskie Voivodeship regulated by the Act of 6 January 2005 on National and Ethnic Minorities and on the Regional Languages, which permits certain gminas with significant linguistic minorities to introduce a second, auxiliary language to be used in official contexts alongside Polish.

References

External links
Jewish cemeteries

Villages in Hajnówka County
Białystok Voivodeship (1919–1939)